The 2009 NORCECA Beach Volleyball Circuit was a North American beach volleyball tour. The tour consisted of eight tournaments in both genders.

After the decision of the Puerto Rican Volleyball Federation, cancelling its player participation in the Mexican steps of the tour, due to the H1N1 flu outbreak in Mexico, the NORCECA board decided to postpone the Mexican steps from May to late September.

Tournaments
  Cayman Islands Tournament, Cayman Islands, March 25–30
   Gatorade Tournament Guatemala, Guatemala, April 1–6
  Presidente Light Boca Chica Tournament, Boca Chica, Dominican Republic, April 8–13
   Jamaica Tournament, Jamaica, June 24–29
   Tijuana Tournament, Tijuana, Mexico, September 23–27
   Maeva Manzanillo Tournament, Manzanillo, Mexico, September 30- October 4
   Puerto Vallarta Tournament, Puerto Vallarta, Mexico, October 7–11
   Nicaragua Tournament, Nicaragua, October 28 – November 2

Tournament results

Women

Men

Medal table by country
Medal table as of November 5, 2009.

References

External links
 Norceca News

 
North American
2009